The Calgary Canucks are a junior A ice hockey team in the Alberta Junior Hockey League (AJHL). They play in Calgary, Alberta, Canada, with home games at the Ken Bracko Arena. They have won the AJHL championship nine times and one national championship.

History

Founded in 1971, the Calgary Canucks are the second-oldest franchise still operating in the Alberta Junior Hockey League (AJHL), preceded only by the Spruce Grove Saints. The Canucks franchise has the longest tenure of any in the AJHL in one city.

The Canucks organization was formed of a group led by Doug Eastcott in order to create a junior team so that local players did not have to live away from where they attended school. As the team considered itself a Calgary-based development system, it set an internal limit of three "imports" (non-Calgary area players) per season. The import cap was eventually dropped as the AJHL has added more teams in the Calgary region such as the Calgary Royals and Okotoks Oilers, causing the team to recruit from a larger region.

The Canucks qualified for the playoffs 34 consecutive seasons, a streak finally broken in 2006–07, The team has 11 regular season titles, nine AJHL championships, two Doyle Cup titles, and one Centennial Cup National Junior A Championship. The team has developed multiple players that have reached the National Hockey League, including Dany Heatley and two-time Stanley Cup winner Mike Vernon. Many more have earned scholarships to American and Canadian universities.

During the 2021–22 season, while renovations made their home Ken Bracko Arena unavailable, the Canucks played their home games at Henry Viney Arena.

Season-by-season record
Note: GP = Games played, W = Wins, L = Losses, T/OTL = Ties/Overtime losses, SOL = Shootout losses, Pts = Points, GF = Goals for, GA = Goals against

Junior A National Championship
The National Junior A Championship, known as the Centennial Cup and formerly as Royal Bank Cup or RBC Cup, is the postseason tournament for the Canadian national championship for Junior A hockey teams that are members of the Canadian Junior Hockey League since 1971. Since 1986, the tournament has consisted of the regional Junior A champions and a previously selected host team. Since 1990, the national championship has used a five-team tournament format when the regional qualifiers were designated as the ANAVET Cup (Western), Doyle Cup (Pacific), Dudley Hewitt Cup (Central), and Fred Page Cup (Eastern). From 2013 to 2017, the qualifiers were the Dudley Hewitt Cup (Central), Fred Page Cup (Eastern), and the Western Canada Cup champions and runners-up (Western #1 and #2).

The tournament begins with round-robin play between the five teams followed by the top four teams playing a semifinal game, with the top seed facing the fourth seed and the second facing the third. The winners of the semifinals then face each other in final game for the national championship. In some years, the losers of the semifinal games face each other for a third place game.

NHL alumni
The following former Canucks have gone on to play in the National Hockey League (NHL):

See also
List of ice hockey teams in Alberta
Ice hockey in Calgary
Calgary Buffaloes (AJHL)
Calgary Cowboys (AJHL)
Calgary Spurs

References

External links
Calgary Canucks website
Alberta Junior Hockey League website

Alberta Junior Hockey League teams
Canucks, Calgary
Ice hockey teams in Alberta
Ice hockey clubs established in 1971
1971 establishments in Alberta